The 1944 All-Ireland Senior Camogie Championship Final was the thirteenth All-Ireland Final and the deciding match of the 1944 All-Ireland Senior Camogie Championship, an inter-county camogie tournament for the top teams in Ireland.

Antrim were the first Ulster team to reach the final, but disappointed on the day, failing to score as Dublin finished a three-in-a-row.

References

All-Ireland Senior Camogie Championship Finals
All-Ireland Senior Camogie Championship Final
All-Ireland Senior Camogie Championship Final
All-Ireland Senior Camogie Championship Final
Dublin county camogie team matches